The NACAC U20 Championships in Athletics is an bi-annual championships to athletes under-20 years of age in the year of competition held between the member associations of the North American, Central American and Caribbean Athletic Association (NACAC). The inaugural edition took place in 2021 in San José, Costa Rica.

Editions

Championships records

Men

Women

References

External links
2021 NACAC U23 U20 and U18 Championships in Ahtletics Results

U20
NACAC Under-20 Championships in Athletics
Under-20 athletics competitions
Recurring sporting events established in 2021
Continental athletics championships
Biennial athletics competitions